Leesburg High School, also known as Lee County High School, is a historic high school in Leesburg, Georgia, United States. It was added to the National Register of Historic Places on February 1, 2006. It is located at 100 Starkville Avenue. The school's teams compete as the Trojans.

It is a two-story brick building designed by Macon architects Dennis and Dennis and built by contractor/architect I. P. Crutchfield.

See also
 National Register of Historic Places listings in Lee County, Georgia

References

External links
Lee County School website

Schools in Lee County, Georgia
School buildings on the National Register of Historic Places in Georgia (U.S. state)
Buildings and structures on the National Register of Historic Places in Georgia (U.S. state)